The British Virgin Islands Football Association is the governing body of football in the British Virgin Islands.The Association is also responsible for the British Virgin Islands national football team.

Association staff

Competitions
The BVIFA oversees the administration of British Virgin Islands's football leagues; the BVIFA National Football League, FA Women's League, FA National Youth Leagues and the FA Futsal League as well as the FA Festival Cup, FA Big Four, Super 6 and other FA Sanctioned Tournaments

References

External links
 Official website
 British Virgin Islands at the FIFA website.
 British Virgin Islands at CONCACAF website

CONCACAF member associations
Football in the British Virgin Islands
Football
Sports organizations established in 1974
1974 establishments in the British Virgin Islands